Śniadka Pierwsza  is a village in the administrative district of Gmina Bodzentyn, within Kielce County, Świętokrzyskie Voivodeship, in south-central Poland.

References

Villages in Kielce County